Kristin Denise Smart (born February 20, 1977declared legally dead May 25, 2002) was an American woman murdered by Paul Flores at the end of her freshman year on the campus of California Polytechnic State University, San Luis Obispo (Cal Poly San Luis Obispo).

On May 25, 1996, Smart attended a fellow Cal Poly University student’s off-campus party. At approximately 2 a.m., she was found passed out on a neighbor's lawn, and two students began to help her walk to her dorm room. A third student named Paul Flores joined the group, and due to the proximity of his dorm to Smart's, Flores told the other two students he would get Kristin home safely. Smart was never seen again, and searches conducted since her disappearance have yielded no trace of her.

Smart's disappearance resulted in state legislation, including the Kristin Smart Campus Security Act, a bill which requires all public colleges and publicly funded educational institutions in California to have their security services make agreements with local police departments regarding cases involving or possibly involving violence against students, including missing students. The bill was passed unanimously by the California State Legislature and was signed into law by Governor Pete Wilson.

On April 13, 2021, Flores and his father, Ruben Flores, were arrested and taken into custody on suspicion of Smart's disappearance. Their homes were searched, and investigators found numerous "items of interest" in the son's home. Their trial began in July 2022. On October 18, 2022, Paul Flores was found guilty of the murder of Kristin Smart, and Ruben Flores was acquitted of 'accessory after the fact'. On March 10, 2023, Paul was sentenced to 25 years to life in prison. The trial was held in Monterey County Superior Court in Salinas, California.

Background
Kristin Denise Smart was born February 20, 1977, in Augsburg, Bavaria, West Germany, to Stan and Denise Smart, both teachers to children of American military personnel. She had one brother and one sister. When she was a child, Smart moved with her family to Stockton, California. She attended and graduated from Stockton's Lincoln High School in 1995. Before her disappearance, she worked as a lifeguard and camp counselor at Camp Mokuleia in Hawaii.

Disappearance
Smart enrolled at California Polytechnic State University, San Luis Obispo (Cal Poly) in San Luis Obispo, California, in 1996. On the night of May 25, 1996, which fell on Memorial Day weekend, she attended a birthday party where she did not know anyone at a fraternity house. She walked to and attended the party alone as a friend of hers decided to return to the dorms earlier that night so they split up.

At approximately 2 a.m. Smart was found passed out on a neighbor's lawn by two fellow students, Cheryl Anderson and Tim Davis, who both had just left the party. They helped Smart to her feet and decided to walk her back to her nearby dormitory. Another student from the party, Paul Flores, joined their group and offered to help the two return Smart to her dorm room.

Davis departed the group first since he lived off-campus and had driven to the party. Anderson was the second to depart the group, heading to Sierra Madre Hall, after Flores, who lived closer to Smart's dorm, assured Anderson that he could walk her there. Flores stated to police that he walked Smart as far as his dormitory, Santa Lucia Hall, and then allowed her to walk back to her Muir Hall dorm by herself. This was the last known sighting of her. Smart did not have any money or credit cards at the time she went missing.

Official investigation
The University Police Department originally suspected that Smart had gone on an unannounced vacation, as was common among students over the holidays, and as a result were slow in reporting her as a missing person to local law enforcement. She was only reported missing after a week, despite her family calling the police earlier.

Several volunteers searched for Smart. Some of them were riding horses, and some used ground-penetrating radar devices.

During the Laci Peterson murder investigation, there were unfounded rumors in the media that Laci's husband, Scott Peterson, had something to do with Smart's disappearance due to their simultaneous attendance at the Cal Poly campus. There was a brief initial inquiry into whether Peterson was tied to the disappearance, with Peterson denying any involvement, and he was eventually ruled out as a suspect by police.

Although her body was never discovered, an earring that might have belonged to Smart was found by a tenant at the former residence of Paul Flores's mother. This earring was not marked as evidence and has since been lost by the police. Between 1996 and 2007, various searches for her remains and other evidence were conducted, some using cadaver dogs trained to detect the scent of human remains, including searches of properties owned by the Flores family. No useful leads were found for nearly two decades.

On September 6, 2016, officials from the San Luis Obispo County Sheriff's Office announced they were investigating a new lead in the case. Cadaver dogs from the FBI were brought in and investigators were preparing to spend approximately four days excavating an area on the Cal Poly campus. After three days, items were found at all three dig sites located on the same hillside near Smart's dorm. A spokesman for the sheriff's office said, "The items are being analyzed to see whether they are connected to the case, which could take days, weeks, or months". The items uncovered were still being investigated .

On April 20, 2021, it was announced by the prosecutor that they believe Kristin's body had been buried beneath the deck of Ruben Flores's home, but had recently been removed. Biological evidence was found by using ground penetrating radar and cadaver dogs.

Legal proceedings
Smart was declared legally dead on May 25, 2002, the sixth anniversary of her disappearance. In 2005, her parents, Denise and Stan Smart, filed a civil case of wrongful death against Flores, one of the three students who walked Smart to her dorm. The Smart family was represented by James R. Murphy, on a pro bono basis. The suit was dropped due to lack of evidence after Flores pled the Fifth Amendment. In 2006 or 2007, the Flores family filed a lawsuit against the Smart family for emotional distress, but the lawsuit never resulted in a judgment.

The San Luis Obispo County Sheriff's Office regularly reviewed the case, and spent thousands of hours and dollars during the period 2011–2016. The FBI had her on file as a high priority missing person investigation, with a reward of $75,000 for information leading to finding her or resolving her case. Terry Black, a Delta-area man, offered a $100,000 reward for Smart's body.

Publicity
Beginning on September 30, 2019, the musician Chris Lambert released a series of ten podcast episodes. The podcast recounts, in detail, Kristin's probable abduction and subsequent death at the hands of another student on the campus of California Polytechnic State University, 23 years prior. The podcast has been downloaded over twelve million times. Renewed public interest led to a new billboard being put up in Arroyo Grande in January 2020 to replace the original, which had been up since 1997.

On January 18, 2020, the Stockton Record reported that the FBI informed Smart's family that additional news about her disappearance would be coming and that the family "might want to get away for a while" but did not provide any specific information. However, on January 22, 2020, The Record issued a correction: the FBI did not contact the Smart family; rather, a retired FBI agent who had been in contact with the family for years was the source of the advice. On January 29, 2020, the San Luis Obispo police department confirmed that two trucks owned by Flores had been taken in as evidence. On February 5, 2020, search warrants were served for "specific items of evidence" at four different locations two in San Luis Obispo, one in Washington state, and at a home in Los Angeles County. Flores was briefly detained during the search.

Date rape drug
On April 22, 2020, the Los Angeles Times reported that a search warrant was served at the home of Paul Flores in San Pedro, California.  The Los Angeles County Sheriff's Department assisted detectives from San Luis Obispo County Sheriff Department in the search. It was reported that numerous "items of interest" were successfully found during the search. Among the items found in the search were date rape drugs and homemade videos showing Flores in acts of sodomizing and raping young women.

On February 11, 2021, KSBY reported that Paul Flores had been arrested by the Los Angeles Police Department in Rancho Palos Verdes, California, on suspicion of being a felon in possession of a firearm, which is a felony. On March 15, 2021, a search warrant was issued to search Ruben Flores's home, including the use of cadaver dogs and ground-penetrating radar. An older-model Volkswagen was towed from the home of Ruben Flores after cadaver dogs searched the vehicle.

Arrest
On April 13, 2021, Paul Flores and his father, Ruben Flores, were taken into custody by the San Luis Obispo County Sheriff's Department in relation to the case.  Paul Flores was charged with murder; Ruben Flores was charged with being an accessory. Investigations later concluded that Paul Flores attempted to rape Smart, although Dan Dow, District Attorney of the County of San Luis Obispo, has stated that the statute of limitations has expired on a sexual assault charge, but murder committed in the course of rape or attempted rape justified first-degree felony murder charges. In September 2021 a judge ruled that there was sufficient evidence of guilt for the case to proceed to trial. 

The trial was set to begin on April 25, 2022, but was delayed, as a change of venue motion by the defense was granted on March 30, 2022. The case was moved to Monterey County, where it was heard by Judge Jennifer O'Keefe. Pretrial motions were heard on June 6 and 7, 2022, with some ruled upon and other rulings deferred. Over 1,500 jury summonses were sent to County residents. Jury selection began on June 13, and opening arguments began on July 18.

Verdict 
On October 18, 2022, the separate juries that were hearing the case simultaneously at the Monterey County Courthouse found Paul Flores guilty of first-degree murder and father Ruben Flores not guilty of accessory after the fact. Ruben Flores was facing a maximum sentence of three years in jail. One juror on the Ruben Flores case told Judge O'Keefe that he had discussed this case with his priest for "spiritual guidance" as it "was causing him stress". That juror was dismissed and an alternate was sworn in, causing deliberations to begin again. Paul Flores was sentenced to 25 years to life on March 10, 2023.

Legacy 
Smart's disappearance and slow response by the campus police resulted in the Kristin Smart Campus Security Act being written and sponsored by State Senator Mike Thompson, passed 61–0 by the California State Legislature, and signed into effect by then-Governor Pete Wilson on August 19, 1998. The law took effect on January 1, 1999, and requires all public colleges and publicly funded educational institutions to have their security services make agreements with local police departments about reporting cases involving or possibly involving violence against students, including missing students.

See also 
 Disappearance of Lauren Spierer
 Disappearance of Tara Grinstead
 Disappeared (TV series)
 Murder of Holly Bobo
 List of kidnappings
 List of solved missing person cases

Citations

General sources

External links
 FBI Missing Person Report on Kristin Smart
 San Luis Obispo County Sheriff's Department Report on Kristin's Disappearance
 North American Missing Persons Network Report on Kristin's Case
 Article about the investigation into Scott Peterson's possible connection with Kristin Smart's disappearance.
 The Charley Project: Kristin Smart
 Reader's Room Article on Kristin's disappearance
 findkristinsmart.org
 The text of Kristin Smart Campus Security Act 1998 from the California State Legislature Senate website.
 KSBY Investigates: Kristin Smart disappearance
 
 kristinsmart.org website
 Kristin Smart Was Killed During Attempted Rape, Prosecutor Says

1977 births
1990s missing person cases
1996 in California
1996 murders in the United States
California Polytechnic State University
Female murder victims
History of women in California
Incidents of violence against women
Kidnapped American people
Kidnappings in the United States
May 1996 crimes
May 1996 events in the United States
Missing person cases in California
Murder convictions without a body
People declared dead in absentia
People murdered in California